Proteocephalus is a genus of flatworms belonging to the family Proteocephalidae.

The genus has cosmopolitan distribution.

Species:
 Proteocephalus aberrans Brooks, 1978
 Proteocephalus abscisus

References

Platyhelminthes